Eupithecia apta is a moth in the family Geometridae. It is found in south-western China (Yunnan).

The wingspan is about 17.5 mm. The forewings are pale yellow-brown and the hindwings are uniform pale yellow-brown.

References

Moths described in 2004
apta
Moths of Asia